Borophagus pugnator is an extinct species of the genus Borophagus of the subfamily Borophaginae, a group of canids endemic to North America from the early Miocene epoch through the late Miocene epoch 23.3—5.3 Ma.

Overview
Borophagus, like other Borophaginae, are loosely known as "bone-crushing" or "hyena-like" dogs.  Though not the most massive borophagine by size or weight, it had a more highly evolved capacity to crunch bone than earlier, larger genera such as Epicyon, which seems to be an evolutionary trend of the group (Turner, 2004). During the Pliocene epoch, Borophagus began being displaced by Canis genera such as Canis edwardii and later by Canis dirus. Early species of Borophagus were placed in the genus Osteoborus until recently, but the genera are now considered synonyms. Borophagus pugnator possibly led a hyena-like lifestyle scavenging carcasses of recently dead animals.

Taxonomy
Typical features of this genus are a bulging forehead and powerful jaws; it was probably a scavenger. Its crushing premolar teeth and strong jaw muscles would have been used to crack open bone, much like the hyena of the Old World. The adult animal is estimated to have been about 80 cm in length, similar to a coyote, although it was much more powerfully built.

Recombination
Borophagus pugnator was originally named Porthocyon pugnator by Cook 1932. It was recombined by Matthew as Aelurodon pugnator in 1924 followed by Matthew and Stirton in 1830. It was then recombined as Osteoborus pugnator by Stirton and VanderHoof in 1933 and others until recombined as Borophagus pugnator by VanderHoof (1931) and X. Wang et al. in 1999.

Fossil distribution
Specimens were found at only two sites. Near Withlacoochee River, Florida and coastal North Carolina.

References 

Alan Turner, "National Geographic:  Prehistoric Mammals" (Washington, D.C.:  Firecrest Books Ltd., 2004), pp. 112–114.  
Xiaoming Wang, "The Origin and Evolution of the Dog Family"  Accessed 1/30/06.

Further reading
Picture of an Osteoborus skull in a museum, from "World of the Wolf."  (Accessed 6/19/06)
Russell Hunt, "Ecological Polarities Of the North American Family Canidae: A New Approach to Understanding Forty Million Years of Canid Evolution" (Accessed 1/30/06).
Wang et al., "Phylogenetic Systematics of the Borophaginae (Carnivora:Canidae)."  Bulletin of the American Museum of Natural History, No. 243, Nov. 17 1999. (PDF) (Accessed 4/11/06)

Borophagines
Miocene canids
Pliocene carnivorans
Prehistoric mammals of North America